Bittiolum varium, common name the grass cerith, is a species of sea snail, a marine gastropod mollusk in the family Cerithiidae.

Distribution
Bittiolum varium occurs in shallow waters ( depth) of the Western Atlantic between the East Coast of the United States (Maryland) and Brazil.

Description 
The maximum recorded shell length is 6.5 mm.

Habitat 
The minimum recorded depth for this species is 0 m; maximum recorded depth is 11 m.

References

External links

Cerithiidae
Gastropods described in 1840
Molluscs of the Atlantic Ocean
Taxa named by Ludwig Karl Georg Pfeiffer